Smirnenski may refer to:

Places:
 Smirnenski, Montana Province - a village in Brusartsi municipality, Montana Province, Bulgaria
 Smirnenski, Rousse Province - a village in Vetovo municipality, Rousse Province, Bulgaria

Surname:
 Hristo Smirnenski (1898–1923), a Bulgarian poet and writer